Hipólito Yrigoyen was the 19th president of Argentina. 

Hipólito Yrigoyen may also refer to:
 Hipólito Yrigoyen Partido, a district in Buenos Aires Province, Argentina
 Hipólito Yrigoyen, Misiones, a village in Argentina
 Hipólito Yrigoyen, Salta, a town in Argentina
 Hipólito Yrigoyen, Santa Cruz, a village in Argentina